Melissa Sheehy-Richard is a Canadian politician, who was elected to the Nova Scotia House of Assembly in the 2021 Nova Scotia general election. She represents the riding of Hants West as a member of the Progressive Conservative Association of Nova Scotia.

Ms. Sheehy-Richard is a paralegal and operates her own home-based business.

References

Year of birth missing (living people)
Living people
Progressive Conservative Association of Nova Scotia MLAs
21st-century Canadian politicians
21st-century Canadian women politicians
Women MLAs in Nova Scotia
People from Hants County, Nova Scotia